Rex Beauford Thomas (April 16, 1902 – March 28, 1955) was a professional American football player who played wide receiver for five seasons for the Brooklyn Lions, Cleveland Bulldogs, Detroit Wolverines, and Brooklyn Dodgers. He later lived in Sterling, Colorado where he worked in the oilfield industry. Thomas was killed in an automobile collision on March 28, 1955, near Sterling.

References

1902 births
People from Weatherford, Oklahoma
Players of American football from Oklahoma
American football wide receivers
Detroit Panthers players
Brooklyn Dodgers (NFL) players
Cleveland Bulldogs players
Brooklyn Lions players
Tulsa Golden Hurricane football players
1955 deaths